"The Cullercoats Fish Lass" is a folk song, written by Edward Corvan, originally printed as a broadside in 1862 and collated in Allan's Illustrated Edition of Tyneside Songs and Readings in 1891.

Fish Lass is a Geordie term for a fishwife. The Cullercoats Fish Lass was a term for a fishwife from Cullercoats, a small fishing village near the mouth of the Tyne. The Cullercoats Fish Lass was popular with locals and tourists alike.

Jean F Terry wrote, in 1913, "The Cullercoats fishwife, with her cheerful weather-bronzed face, her short jacket and ample skirts of blue flannel, and her heavily laden "creel" of fish is not only appreciated by the brotherhood of brush and pencil, but is one of the notable sights of the district".

Performances

The song was very popular in its day and was probably performed by the composer, Ned Corvan, in drag. Almost all of Corvan's works are examples of the traditional dialect of Tyneside (known as Geordie) in the mid-19th century.

Ned Corvan, as he was known, was a popular music hall performer, renowned for concerts and venues "of the free and easy type...not specially noted for their refinement".

There are two tunes associated with the song, The German Song and Lilla's a Lady.

The song provides part of the soundtrack for The Cullercoats Fish Lass, a film by the film company ACT 2 CAM. The film premiered in November 2013

Lyrics 

 

Tune: "Lilla's a Lady"/"Lilie's a Lady"

External links
 Allan’s Illustrated Edition of Tyneside songs and readings
 Northumberland Yesterday and Today
 Folk Archive Resource North East

References

English folk songs
1862 songs
Songs related to Newcastle upon Tyne
Northumbrian folklore